The Hand and Heart is a public house at 12 Highbury Street, Peterborough, Cambridgeshire, PE1 3BE.

It is on the Campaign for Real Ale's National Inventory of Historic Pub Interiors.

It was built in 1938, and its interwar interior is largely unchanged.

External links
Official website

References

Buildings and structures in Peterborough
National Inventory Pubs